Caret notation is a notation for control characters in ASCII. The notation assigns  to control-code 1, sequentially through the alphabet to  assigned to control-code 26 (0x1A). For the control-codes outside of the range 1–26, the notation extends to the adjacent, non-alphabetic ASCII characters.

The notation is often used to describe keyboard shortcuts even though the control character is not actually used (as in "type ^X to cut the text").

The meaning or interpretation of, or response to the individual control-codes is not prescribed by the caret notation.

Description
The notation consists of a caret followed by a single character (usually a capital letter). The character has the ASCII code equal to the control code with the bit representing 0x40 reversed. A useful mnemonic, this has the effect of rendering the control codes 1 through 26 as  through .

Examples are "" for the Windows CR, LF newline pair, and describing the ANSI escape sequence to clear the screen as "".

Only the use of characters in the range of 63–95 ("") is specifically allowed in the notation, but use of lower-case alphabetic characters entered at the keyboard is nearly always allowed – they are treated as equivalent to upper-case letters.

The conversion is a bit-wise exclusive or with 0x40 (64). This is identical to adding 64 modulus 128, or adding 64 and masking with 0x7F. This same operation is done both to convert from a control code to the character to print after the caret, and the reverse to convert a character to a control code. When converting to a control character, except for '?', masking with 0x1F will produce the same result and also turn lower-case into the same control character as upper-case.

There is no corresponding version of the caret notation for control-codes with more than 7 bits such as the C1 control characters from 128–159 (0x80–0x9F). Some programs that produce caret notation show these as backslash and octal ("" through ""). Also see the bar notation used by Acorn Computers, below.

History

The convention dates back to at least the PDP-6 (1964). A manual for the PDP-6 describes  as printing ↑C, i.e. a small superscript upwards arrow before the C. In the change from 1961 ASCII to 1968 ASCII, the up arrow became a caret.

Use in software
Many computer systems allow the user to enter a control character by holding down  and pressing the letter used in the caret notation. This is practical, because many control characters (e.g. EOT) cannot be entered directly from a keyboard. Although there are many ways to represent control characters, this correspondence between notation and typing makes the caret notation suitable for many applications.

Usually the need to hold down  is avoided, for instance lower-case letters work just like upper-case ones. On a US keyboard layout  produces DEL and  produces ^@.

Although the use of control-codes is somewhat standard, some uses differ from operating system to operating system, or even from program to program. The actual meaning or interpretation of the individual control-codes is not prescribed by the caret notation, and although the ASCII specification does give names to the control-codes, it does not prescribe how software should respond to them.

Alternate notations 
The GSTrans string processing API on the operating systems for the Acorn Atom and the BBC Micro, and on RISC OS for the Acorn Archimedes and later machines, use the vertical bar character  in place of the caret. For example,  (pronounced "control em", the same as for the  notation) is the carriage return character, ASCII 13.  is the vertical bar character code 124,  is character 127 as above and  adds 128 to the code of the character that follows it, so  is character code .

See also 
ASCII control characters
C0 and C1 control codes, which shows the caret notation for all C0 control codes as well as DEL
Control key

References 

Control characters
Character sets